Harry H. Maskrey  (December 21, 1861 – August 17, 1930), was a professional baseball player who played outfield in the Major Leagues for the 1882 Louisville Eclipse. He appeared in one game on September 21, 1882 and was hitless in four at-bats for the Eclipse. His brother, Leech Maskrey, also played for the 82 Eclipse.

External links

1861 births
1930 deaths
Major League Baseball outfielders
Louisville Eclipse players
19th-century baseball players
Baseball players from Pennsylvania
People from Mercer, Pennsylvania